Hans Pedersen Herrefosser (8 December 1800 – 4 August 1869) was a Norwegian politician.

He was elected to the Norwegian Parliament in 1842, representing the rural constituency of Smaalenenes Amt (today named Østfold). He worked as a farmer. He sat through one term.

References

1800 births
1869 deaths
Members of the Storting
Østfold politicians